Ponte Lambro is a comune (municipality) in the Province of Como in the Italian region Lombardy, located about  north of Milan and about  east of Como.

Ponte Lambro borders the following municipalities: Caslino d'Erba, Castelmarte, Erba.

Demographic evolution

Twin towns
 Zawiercie, Poland, since 2004
 Kamianets-Podilskyi, Ukraine, since 2006
 Cortale, Italy, since 2010
 Carbone, Italy, since 2010

References

Cities and towns in Lombardy